Government Medical College, Miraj or GMC Miraj is a medical college located in Sangli, Maharashtra affiliated to Maharashtra University of Health Sciences and Recognized by Medical Council of India

Established- 1962

It has 200 undergraduate seats for MBBS course.

Total PG seats - 47 including

MD Medicine- 7,
MS Surgery-7,
MS Ophthalmology-3,
Diploma in Child Health-2

References

External links
 

Medical colleges in Maharashtra
Education in Sangli district
Educational institutions established in 1962
1962 establishments in Maharashtra
Affiliates of Maharashtra University of Health Sciences